This is a list of works by Frederic Edwin Church  (1826–1900), an American landscape painter who was part of the Hudson River School. Church's paintings were inspired by his travels, including Africa, Europe, the Middle East, South America, and North America. Sketches are excluded—Church made thousands—unless they are in oil and very finished.

Works

References

Bibliography 

 
 
 

Lists of paintings